Tehila Hakimi (in Hebrew: תהילה חכימי; born February 27, 1982) is an Israeli poet and author.

Writing 
Hakimi, who has a degree in mechanical engineering, began publishing her poetry in 2013, in the journals "Merhav" and "Ma'ayan", and in two anthologies – a collection of poems from Beersheba, and the second Ars Poetica anthology, edited by Adi Keissar.

Her first poetry collection, We’ll Work Tomorrow (מחר נעבוד) came out in 2014. The book won the Bernstein Literature Award for 2015.

Hakimi edited the children's book Afternoon Kids (Tangier, 2015) by Avihai Nizri, illustrated by Liron Cohen.

Her second book, In the Water, is a graphic novel, created in collaboration with illustrator Liron Cohen; it was published in 2016.

Hakimi's next book, her first published prose work, is Company. The word in Hebrew, Hevra means company as translated to English – both in the commercial sense and as in 'keeping company' – but it also means 'society'. The book deals with the minutiae as well as all the big questions of a body in the never-ending cycle of 21st century work – from a woman's perspective, outlining the expected aspects of corporate work, with the additional aspects of sexual harassment, taking care of home and children, and other issues, as Hakimi stated: "The world of work was planned for the work of men. A woman at work is a priori a strange thing. It isn't just because she has another internal cycle. From salaries to opportunities for advancement, through the issues of everyday maltreatment and harassment – workplaces are still not equal for women."

In his review in Ha'aretz, Amos Noy wrote: "Great literature is created at the meeting point between experience and language. And 'Company', Tehila Hakimi's new book, is great literature in my opinion." Yoni Livne, writing for ynet, opined, "This is what would result if Kubric and Bowie worked in an office." Neta Amit, in the online feminist magazine Politically Corret, wrote: "She is telling us... Don't make me choose; I am a woman and a mechanical engineer. A Mizrahi, and a poet. An engineer and an author. This expectation that we must choose – one profession, one identity – is meant to actually fit us into a mold that is comfortable for (the patriarchal, capitalistic) society. To fit you into a box, which will more than likely reduce you, but will enable the 'Company' [society] to embrace you."

Hakimi received the Emerging Poets Award from the Ministry of Culture in 2015. Among the reasons cited for the award:

"Her poems indicate that her watchful eye and her sensitive gaze miss no detail, and give no quarter. The narrator in her poems lives her life, but does not like what she sees or what happens to her in the world she lives in. Her critiques, even regarding well-recognized injustices, are expressed through her unique, clear vision."

Books 

 2014 – מחר נעבוד, (Tomorrow We Work, Tangier publishing)
 2016 – במים, (In the Water)
 2018 – חֶבְרָה, (Company, Resling – Original Israeli Literature series)

Awards 

 2015 – Ministry of Culture Emerging Poets Award
 2015 – 2nd place, "Songs Along the Way" contest, Municipality of Tel Aviv (for her poem "Jacob")
 2015 – Bernstein Literature Award, for her first poetry collection, Tomorrow We Work
 2018 – Fulbright scholarship, to attend the international writing program at University of Iowa
 2018 – The Prime Minister's Prize for Hebrew Literary Works

References

External links 

 Tehila Hakimi's blog (in Hebrew)
 Interview with Tehila Hakimi, IWP
 "Sacred and Profane" by Tehila Hakimi, translated from the Hebrew by Adam Seelig and Rachel Seelig, Poetry Review, London, England, Summer 2019.
 A Woman in Workspace, World Literature today, an excerpt from 'Company': "Israeli writer Tehila Hakimi’s Company (2018) is an experimental, fragmentary text—addressed to a nameless “woman in a workspace"—that tries to address, head-on, the corporate work experience, its gendered dimensions, and its operative, emptied-out language."

Mizrahi feminists
Israeli women poets
Israeli poets
1982 births
Living people
Recipients of Prime Minister's Prize for Hebrew Literary Works